Mimusops elengi is a medium-sized evergreen tree found in tropical forests in South Asia, Southeast Asia and northern Australia. English common names include Spanish cherry, medlar, and bullet wood. Its timber is valuable, the fruit is edible, and it is used in  traditional medicine. As the trees give thick shade and flowers emit fragrance, it is a prized collection of gardens.

Its flower is the provincial flower of Yala Province, Thailand, as well as the city flower of Ampang Jaya, Selangor, Malaysia.

Tree description

It flowers in April, and fruiting occurs between June and October. The flowers are cream, hairy, and scented. The fruits are fleshy, range in color between yellow and brown, and contain a large brown seed. The pulp has a yellow color and it is edible. The bark of the tree is thick and appears dark brownish black or grayish black in colour, with striations and a few cracks on the surface.

Distribution 
The plant is native to South and Southeast Asia, particularly the coastal areas of the Indian subcontinent, Bangladesh, Sri Lanka, Vietnam and Myanmar, as well as Northern Australia. It was introduced in China in the 20th century, and it is now cultivated in its south, as well as in Taiwan.

Ayurvedic uses
The bark, flowers, fruits, and seeds of Bakula are used in Ayurvedic medicine in which it is purported to be astringent, cooling, anthelmintic, tonic, and febrifuge. It is mainly used for dental ailments such as bleeding gums, pyorrhea, dental caries, and loose teeth.

Other uses
The flowers are sun dried and used to make floral infusions and as an addition to green tea in Thailand.
The edible fruit is softly hairy becoming smooth, ovoid, bright red-orange when ripe.
The wood is a luxurious wood that is extremely hard, strong and tough, and rich deep red in color. The heartwood is sharply defined from the sapwood. It works easily  and takes a beautiful polish. Density is 1008 kg per cubic meter.

References

Further reading
Brock, J., Top End Native Plants, 1988. 

elengi
Indomalayan realm flora
Ericales of Australia
Eudicots of Western Australia
Flora of the Northern Territory
Flora of Queensland
Flora of tropical Asia
Flora of New Caledonia
Flora of Vanuatu
Bushfood
Plants described in 1753
Taxa named by Carl Linnaeus
Fruits originating in Asia